Edgcumbe Beach is a rural locality in the local government area (LGA) of Circular Head in the North-west and west LGA region of Tasmania. The 2016 census recorded a population of 54 for the state suburb of Edgcumbe Beach.

History 
Edgcumbe Beach was gazetted as a locality in 1962. It is believed to be named for an early settler.

Geography
The waters of Bass Strait form the northern boundary.

Road infrastructure 
Route A2 (Bass Highway) runs through from north-east to north-west.

References

Towns in Tasmania
Localities of Circular Head Council